

Window Clippings is a Windows utility that enables users to capture screenshots from open windows and menus so that the transparency (alpha channel) of target window is also captured.  This includes shadows and translucent glass areas produced by Windows Aero in Windows Vista and Windows 7. It supports add-ins which extend its functionality. Window Clippings 2.1 comes with a handful of add-ins that enable it to send taken screenshots directly to Paint.NET or Microsoft OneNote.

Window Clippings 2.0.28 was the last freeware version. The trial version of 2.1.16 and onwards watermark the screenshots in the lower right corner (version 2) or in the center (version 3) of each image. It was acquired by Epsitec in early 2011.

References

Further reading

External links
 

Screenshot software
Windows-only shareware